Lawsonia inermis, also known as hina, the henna tree, the mignonette tree, and the Egyptian privet, is a flowering plant and one of the only two species of the genus Lawsonia, with the other being Lawsonia odorata. The species is named after the Scottish physician Isaac Lawson, a good friend of Linnaeus.

Description
Henna is a tall shrub or small tree, standing . It is glabrous and multi-branched, with spine-tipped branchlets. The leaves grow opposite each other on the stem. They are glabrous, sub-sessile, elliptical, and lanceolate (long and wider in the middle; average dimensions are 1.5–5.0 cm x 0.5–2 cm or .6–2 in x 0.2–0.8 in), acuminate (tapering to a long point), and have depressed veins on the dorsal surface. Henna flowers have four sepals and a  calyx tube, with  spread lobes. Its petals are ovate, with white or red stamens found in pairs on the rim of the calyx tube. Henna fruits are small, brownish capsules,  in diameter, with 32–49 seeds per fruit, and open irregularly into four splits.

Distribution and habitat 
The henna plant is native to northern Africa, Asia and northern Australia, in semi-arid zones and tropical areas.

Cultivation 
During the onset of precipitation intervals, the plant grows rapidly, putting out new shoots. Growth subsequently slows. The leaves gradually yellow and fall during prolonged dry or cool intervals. It does not thrive where minimum temperatures are below . Temperatures below  will kill the henna plant.

Dye 

It is the source of the dye henna used to dye skin, hair and fingernails, as well as fabrics including silk, wool and leather.

References

Plants described in 1753
Taxa named by Carl Linnaeus
Lythraceae
Plant dyes